The Tiger of Eschnapur may refer to:

 The Tiger of Eschnapur (1938 film), a 1938 German film directed by Richard Eichberg
 The Tiger of Eschnapur (1959 film), a 1959 German film directed by Fritz Lang
 The second part of the 1921 German silent film The Indian Tomb directed by Joe May, see The Indian Tomb

See also
The Indian Tomb (disambiguation)